Coal County is a county located in the U.S. state of Oklahoma. As of the 2010 census, the population was 5,925. Its county seat is Coalgate.

History
Coal County was formed at statehood from the former Shappaway County (later renamed Atoka County) of the Pushmataha District of the Choctaw Nation in Indian Territory. A  strip of Coal County was taken from the Pontotoc District of the Chickasaw Nation. Initially, the Oklahoma legislature named Lehigh as the county seat, but a special election held in 1908 resulted in the citizens choosing Coalgate as the county seat. Lehigh tried to sue because more people voted than were registered, but no court would hear the case.

Mining became a mainstay of the county's economy during the 1870s. The first coal mine opened on Chief Allen Wright's land. The industry activity peaked between 1910 and 1916 but declined sharply after World War I. Many of the mines closed by 1921, due to the refusal of mining companies of the area to unionize. Some mines reopened during World War II, but these closed by 1958, because of the rising cost of refining sulfur out of the coal mined.

Agriculture replaced mining as the main economic activity of the county. Even this business encountered severe difficulty in 1921–3 when a boll weevil infestation wiped out the cotton crop. All five banks in the county failed as a result.

Geography
Coal County is in southeastern Oklahoma, in a 10-county area designated for tourism purposes by the Oklahoma Department of Tourism and Recreation as Choctaw Country. It is the fifth-smallest county in Oklahoma by area. The eastern part of the county lies in the Ouachita Mountains, while the western part has open prairie and lies in the Sandstone Hills physiographic region. The county is drained by the Clear Boggy and Muddy Boggy creeks.

Major highways
  U.S. Highway 75
  State Highway 3
  State Highway 31
 State Highway 43
 State Highway 48

Adjacent counties
 Hughes County (north)
 Pittsburg County (northeast)
 Atoka County (southeast)
 Johnston County (southwest)
 Pontotoc County (west)

Demographics

As of the 2010 United States Census, there were 5,295 people, 2,350 households, and 1,604 families residing in the county. There were 2,810 housing units. The racial makeup of the county was 74.3% White, 0.5% Black or African American, 16.7% Native American, 0.2% Asian, 0.5% from other races, and 7.8% from two or more races. 2.6% of the population were Hispanic or Latino of any race.

There were 2,350 households, out of which 27.7% had children under the age of 18 living with them, 50.8% were married couples living together, 12.1% had a female householder with no husband present, and 31.7% were non-families.  28.1% of all households were made up of individuals, and 14.6% had someone living alone who was 65 years of age or older.   The average household size was 2.50 and the average family size was 3.06.

In the county, the population was spread out, with 25.5% under the age of 18, 7.2% from 18 to 24, 21.7% from 25 to 44, 27.8% from 45 to 64, and 17.8% who were 65 years of age or older. The median age was 41.0 years. For every 100 females there were 97.7 males. For every 100 females age 18 and over, there were 91.5 males.

According to the 2013 American Community Survey, the median income for a household in the county was $34,867, and the median income for a family was $44,888. Male full-time, year round workers had a median income of $36,442 compared to $26,450 for female full-time, year round workers. The per capita income for the county was $19,752. About 15.8% of families and 21.6% of the population were below the poverty line, including 35.9% of those under age 18 and 15.7% of those age 65 or over.

According to the 2000 census, 94.6% spoke English, 3.0% Spanish, 1.1% German and 1.1% Choctaw as their first language.

Politics
Coal County is in many respects typical of Oklahoma politics. Once a predominantly Democratic county, its elections have become dominated by the Republican Party in recent years, although even today, most voters identify as Democrats. In 1972, Richard Nixon became the first Republican to ever carry the county in a presidential election, and was the only one to do so until the 2000 election. Coal County extremely narrowly supported two Democrats amidst national Republican landslides: James M. Cox by 24 votes in 1920 and Walter Mondale by 25 votes in 1984. The county swung 41 points Republican in the 2008 presidential election, the largest swing of any county in the country.

Communities

Cities
 Coalgate (county seat)
 Centrahoma
 Lehigh
 Tupelo

Towns
 Bromide
 Phillips

Census-designated place
 Clarita

Other unincorporated communities
 Cairo
 Cottonwood
 Olney

NRHP sites

The following sites in Coal County are listed on the National Register of Historic Places:
 Benjamin Franklin Smallwood House, Lehigh
 Coalgate School Gymnasium-Auditorium, Coalgate
 Keel Creek Bridge, Coalgate
 Merchants National Bank Building, Lehigh
 United States Post Office Coalgate, Coalgate

References

External links
 Encyclopedia of Oklahoma History and Culture - Coal County
 Oklahoma Digital Maps: Digital Collections of Oklahoma and Indian Territory

 
1907 establishments in Oklahoma
Populated places established in 1907